The Khangarot is a Kachhwaha clan in India.

References

Further reading
Henige, David (2004). Princely states of India;A guide to chronology and rulers

Hindu dynasties
Rajput clans of Rajasthan